Jack Christopher Allsopp (born 1975), known by the stage name Just Jack, is an English musician from Camden Town, London. He first came to prominence with the release of his 2007 single "Starz in Their Eyes", which reached number two on the UK Singles Chart. He has also since been known for the songs "Embers", peaking at number 17, and "The Day I Died", which peaked at number 11, and the track "Writer's Block".

Background
Born in Camden, Allsopp grew up listening to dance music including breakdance, electro hip hop and house. An amateur breakdancer at eight, he started DJing at the age of 15 and he soon became submerged in DJ culture and UK garage.

After completing a degree in furniture design at Kingston University, he enrolled in a community music production course, so that he could better his awareness of sampling and its potential for use. He went on to practice on perfecting his sound by night and to take on a series of jobs by day.

Career
Allsopp's debut album, titled The Outer Marker, released in 2002 by the independent label RGR Records, was a collection of songs about modern life, relationships, and the pressures of social situations. The album spawned three singles "Paradise (Lost & Found)", "Snowflakes" and "Triple Tone Eyes". "Snowflakes", his first song to enter the charts at number 164, samples The Cure's song "Lullaby" from their album Disintegration.

He did not gain fame until 2007, following his TV debut on BBC2's Later... with Jools Holland, and then on the Channel 4 show The Friday Night Project, where he performed the single "Starz in Their Eyes", which reached number two in the UK Singles Chart. The following three singles from the album Overtones, "Glory Days", "Writer's Block" and "No Time" did not make the top thirty. "Starz In Their Eyes" was also featured in the Dolce & Gabbana Summer 2008 fashion show, and the Xbox 360 Kinect game Kinect Sports. He also collaborated with Kylie Minogue on the song "I Talk Too Much",  for the American release of Overtones.

Allsopp performed at Glastonbury Festival, V Festival and T4 on the Beach in 2007 and again at Glastonbury Festival in 2009. He also performed at Guilfest in 2010.

He released his third album All Night Cinema on 31 August 2009, preceded by its first single "Embers", which had its premiere on BBC Radio 1 on 12 January 2009, and second single "The Day I Died", which became Jack's second highest charting single on the UK Singles Chart, peaking at number 11. Both singles peaked inside the top 20. The original choice for second single was "Doctor Doctor" but the single release was subsequently postponed.

In August 2011, Jack announced on Facebook "So close to finishing a 5 track EP. Just need to find a home for it..." Though later didn't feel like the final track was completed, he released a statement in November 2011 saying "A bit of background info... As some of you will know I recently finished a 4-track EP of new songs. It was going to be 5, but the last song didn't feel properly finished and didn't really work with the others. I'll save it for a later date. Most of the music was recorded at home and, for the first time, I mixed the songs myself. They are a little lo-fi and intentionally not 'radio' or 'singles'. I tried to make them sound warm and natural and intimate, basically the kind of music I would listen to myself. I haven't found a label to put them out through yet, but I wanted you to hear them anyway. The first will be up on Monday (for a few days) via a link to my Soundcloud, and the others will go up on the following 3 Mondays. Over and out." This 4-track EP was later titled Rough/Ready and made available as a free download on 17 April 2012 through the newly designed official Just Jack website. In September 2014, Allsopp released a new EP titled Winning EP.

A third EP titled Life Lessons was released on 6 May 2016 through The Rocket Record Company, his first album on a label since 2009.

He went on to release his fourth album, “What We Did Today” on 27 October in 2017. On 20 September 2019, he released a 7-track EP called Laughing & Crying which contained four new originals and three acoustic covers.

Discography

Studio albums

Singles

See also
 Kid Rad

Notes

References

External links
 Just Jack Official Website
 Just Jack Facebook
 Just Jack Instagram
 Just Jack Twitter
 Just Jack interview at mychemicaltoilet.com

TVT Records artists
English dance musicians
English male singers
English pop singers
English electronic musicians
Living people
Singers from London
1975 births